Zhang Ye (born on April 26, 1987 in China) is a Chinese footballer who currently plays for Zibo Cuju as a midfielder.

He was a member of China U-23 National Football Team.

Club career

Shenzhen Jianlibao
Zhang Ye would move to Chinese Super League football team Shenzhen Jianlibao to start his professional football career in 2005. He was to make his league debut on March 19, 2006 starting a game against Inter Xian in a 0-0 draw. Quickly establishing himself within the team he would go on to score his first and second goals against Shenyang Ginde in a 2-1 victory on August 9, 2006. By the following season Zhang Ye would become an integral member of the team and was one of the few bright aspects in a disappointing season, which also saw him  achieve his first red card on the debut game of the season on March 3, 2007 against Shaanxi Baorong.

Hangzhou Greentown
Zhang Ye together with Fan Xiaodong would both join Hangzhou Greentown at the beginning of the 2009 Chinese Super League season. Zhang Ye would make his debut for the team in their first game of the season against Qingdao Jonoon on March 22 in 2-1 win.

Career statistics 
Statistics accurate as of match played 31 December 2020.

References

External links
Player stats at sohu.com
 

1987 births
Living people
Footballers from Shenyang
Chinese footballers
Zhejiang Professional F.C. players
Shenzhen F.C. players
Liaoning F.C. players
Jiangxi Beidamen F.C. players
China League One players
Chinese Super League players
Association football midfielders